This article presents a list of the historical events and publications of Australian literature during 1873.

Books 

 James Bonwick
 Mike Howe, the Bushranger of Van Diemen's Land
 The Tasmanian Lily
 Edward Maitland – By and By: an historical romance of the future
 Vincent Pyke – The Story of Wild Will Enderby
 Anthony Trollope
 Harry Heathcote of Gangoil : A Tale of Australian Bush Life
 Lady Anna

Short stories 

 Marcus Clarke – Holiday Peak and Other Tales

Poetry 

 Marcus Clarke – "The Song of Tigilau"
 Mary Hannay Foott – "The Aurora Australis"
 Adam Lindsay Gordon – "Lay Me Low"
 John Dunmore Lang – Poems : Sacred and Secular : Written Chiefly at Sea, within the Last Half-Century
 George Gordon McCrae – The Man in the Iron Mask
 John Boyle O'Reilly – Songs from the Southern Seas and Other Poems
 J. Brunton Stephens
 The Black Gin and Other Poems
 "A Brisbane Reverie : March, 1873"
 The Godolphin Arabian : The Story of a Hhorse
 "My Chinee Cook"
 "My Other Chinee Cook"

Births 

A list, ordered by date of birth (and, if the date is either unspecified or repeated, ordered alphabetically by surname) of births in 1873 of Australian literary figures, authors of written works or literature-related individuals follows, including year of death.

 15 August – Erle Cox, novelist and journalist (died 1950)
 27 October – Henry Tate, poet (died 1926)
 24 November – Dora Wilcox, poet and playwright (died 1953)
 11 December – Tilly Aston, blind writer and teacher (died 1947)
 18 December – Edith Joan Lyttleton, author (died 1945)

Unknown date
 Nancy Francis, poet, journalist and short story writer (died 1954)
 Gertrude Hart, novelist (died 1965)
 Leonora Polkinghorne, novelist and poet (died 1953)

Deaths 

A list, ordered by date of death (and, if the date is either unspecified or repeated, ordered alphabetically by surname) of deaths in 1873 of Australian literary figures, authors of written works or literature-related individuals follows, including year of birth.

 19 November — Mary Theresa Vidal, Australia's first female novelist (born 1815)

See also 
 1873 in Australia
 1873 in literature
 1873 in poetry
 List of years in Australian literature
 List of years in literature

References

 
Australia
19th-century Australian literature
Australian literature by year